Brachyopa vittata is a European species of hoverfly.

Distribution
Sweden.

References

Diptera of Europe
Eristalinae
Insects described in 1843
Taxa named by Johan Wilhelm Zetterstedt